The Great Goddess hypothesis theorizes that, in Palaeolithic, Mesolithic and/or Neolithic Europe and Western Asia and North Africa, a singular, monotheistic female deity was worshipped.

Development of the theory 
The theory had been first proposed by the German Classicist Eduard Gerhard in 1849, when he speculated that the various goddesses found in ancient Greek paganism had been representations of a singular goddess who had been worshipped far further back into prehistory. He associated this deity with the concept of Mother Earth, which itself had only been developed in the 18th century by members of the Romanticist Movement. Soon after, this theory began to be adopted by other classicists in France and Germany, such as Ernst Kroker, Fr. Lenormant and M.J. Menant, who further brought in the idea that the ancient peoples of Anatolia and Mesopotamia had influenced the Greek religion, and that therefore they also had once venerated a great goddess. These ideas amongst various classicists echoed those of the Swiss judge J.J. Bachofen, who put forward the idea that the earliest human societies were matriarchal, but had converted to a patriarchal form in later prehistory. Commenting on this idea, the historian Ronald Hutton (1999) remarked that in the eyes of many at the time, it would have been an obvious conclusion that "what was true in a secular sphere should also, logically, have been so in the religious one."

In 1901, the archaeologist Sir Arthur Evans—who in an 1895 work had dismissed the Great Goddess theory—changed his mind and accepted the idea whilst excavating at Knossos on Crete, the site of the Bronze Age Minoan civilisation. After unearthing a number of female figurines, he came to believe that they all represented a singular goddess, who was the Minoan's chief deity, and that all the male figurines found on the site represented a subordinate male god who was both her son and consort, an idea that he based partially upon the later classical myth of Rhea and Zeus.  In later writings in ensuing decades he went on to associate these Neolithic and Bronze Age images with other goddesses around the Near East. As Hutton pointed out, "his influence made this the orthodoxy of Minoan archaeology, although there was always a few colleagues who pointed out that it placed a strain upon the evidence."

See also
 Peter Ucko

References

Further reading 
Eisler, Riane Tennenhaus, (1987). The chalice and the blade : our history, our future (1st ed.). Cambridge [Mass.]: Harper & Row. p. 5. . OCLC 15222627.

Neumann, Erich,. The Great Mother : an analysis of the archetype. Manheim, Ralph, 1907-1992, (First Princeton classics edition ed.). Princeton, New Jersey. . OCLC 908042725.

Walker, Barbara G. (1996, 1983). The woman's encyclopedia of myths and secrets. Edison, N.J.: Castle Books. . OCLC 35824931

Goddesses
Dianic Wicca
Matriarchy
Theism